Allison "Hueman" Torneros is a Filipino-American graffiti artist, painter, and illustrator, based in Oakland, California. Hueman's best-known works include Bloom, a mural in the Los Angeles Arts District commemorating community advocate Joel Bloom, and the cover artwork for Pink’s 2019 record, Hurts 2B Human. As street art is a medium dominated by men, Hueman is noted as a female artist who has achieved significant renown.

Career 
Hueman graduated from the University of California Los Angeles in 2008 with a degree in Design & Media Arts. After graduating, she worked as a freelance graphic designer and web designer.

Early works by Hueman include a Nike-commissioned portrait of Kobe Bryant, a mural for P Diddy's Revolt TV office and Ritual, a 9-day, free-styled, floor-to-ceiling mural installation in a 5,000 sq foot warehouse space. In 2013, Hueman was one of the first artists commissioned to paint a mural after Los Angeles lifted its street art ban. In May 2014, Hueman was named one of LA Weekly's People of the Year and was featured on a limited-edition cover of the issue.

In 2013, Hueman was featured in season 8, episode 27 of Pawn Stars “Say It, Don’t Spray It.” During the episode she is seen painting a mural of the main cast on the garage door of the Gold and Silver Pawn shop. The mural is still there today and is similar in design to Mount Rushmore.

In 2015, she and artist Daniela Rocha curated Wander and Wayfare, which featured murals painted around San Francisco by eight female street artists, as well as a gallery art show. The event "will be an annual exhibition and mural festival that plans to brighten the future of the San Francisco art scene." That July, she also participated in the second annual series of Sea Walls: Murals for Oceans, organized by PangeaSeed in Cozumel, Mexico.

In 2019, Hueman was commissioned by filmmaker Ava Duvernay to paint the facade of her production company Array. Other projects include a painting at Hickory Alley in San Francisco, which is a large mural that spanned 5 buildings, titled Spray Ballet funded by the SF Community Challenge Grant, the design of a Nike shoe for the Olympics, a collaboration with Forever 21, and a refurbished basketball court for the Golden State Warriors at Salesian Boys & Girls Club, unveiled by Stephen Curry. In 2020, Hueman teamed up with Under Armour and Stephen Curry for the release of the Curry 8 Flow. This is the first signature shoe debuting under the two-time NBA MVP’s namesake brand. This same design was used in the refurbishment of the Manzanita court in Oakland, as apart of Curry’s efforts to give back to the community.

In September 2020, she participated in POW! WOW! festival.

Style and influences 
Hueman's signature style includes bright colors and elements of abstract portraiture. Her work has been described as a product of "free association." "Drawing first abstractly and without a definite idea, she will return to the work several times and refine images she sees in the primary, elemental composition."

The name "Hueman" comes from the feelings she had after starting to paint murals for the first time. In a profile in Juxtapoz, she states,"I began painting murals after a dark period in my life when I felt like there was nothing left to lose, and when I painted big for the first time, it was like a light switch turned on. Once I got out of my studio and onto the street, I was using my entire body to paint, I was talking to people, I was collaborating, I was in the sun. I felt alive again. I literally felt human. That's where the name Hueman comes from."

References

External links 

 

Graffiti artists
Living people
Street artists
Pseudonymous artists
Women graffiti artists
American artists of Filipino descent
Women muralists
1985 births